sahibinden.com is an online classifieds and shopping platform in which people and businesses buy and sell real estate, cars and a broad variety of goods and services. Registration and posting listings are free of charge.

History
In the late 1990s Internet entrepreneurship in Turkey began to evolve while classifieds were listed only in traditional media such as newspapers. Thus, in 1999 founder of sahibinden.com and Aksoy Group Vice Chairman Taner Aksoy came up with the idea to carry out the classifieds to Internet enabling sellers to post visually rich and detailed listings, on the other hand providing fast and easy classifieds search for buyers. As a result, sahibinden.com was launched in 2000, and initially contained 2700 classifieds.

As of April 2010, there are more than 1.500.000 listings in different categories like cars, mobile phones, real estate and shoes. In 2009, 3 regional offices are opened in Ankara, Izmir and Antalya major cities in Turkey.

Its headquarters are in Istanbul. sahibinden.com is currently owned by Aksoy Group.

Recognition
sahibinden.com was the most beloved second hand items web site in Turkey, according to Digital Lovemark Research by IPSOS KMG in 2009. According to a research done in Turkey, in 2009 by BRNDTRX, sahibinden.com is the number one in the most liked real estate site, the most trusted real estate site, the real estate website which comes to mind first. According to the Crenvo research done in 2009 in Turkey, 52% of the respondents chose sahibinden.com as the leading brand of the classified listings website (Top of mind awareness). sahibinden.com has won the Altın Örümcek awards for “Best E-Trade” and “Best Classified Ads” in 2009 in Turkey.

References

External links
 Crenvo 2009 presentation on Slideshare
 sahibinden.com is a Love Mark - Ankara Haber
 An Interview with the founder of sahibinden.com - Webrazzi

Companies based in Istanbul
Online marketplaces of Turkey
Internet properties established in 2000
Turkish companies established in 2000